The General Federation of Women's Clubs Headquarters, also known as the Miles Mansion, is a social clubhouse headquarters in Washington, D.C.  Built as a private residence in 1875, it has served as the headquarters of the General Federation of Women's Clubs (GFWC) since 1922.  It was declared a National Historic Landmark in 1991 for its association with the federation, which serves as an umbrella organization for women's clubs, a social movement dating to the mid-19th century.  Tours of the headquarters, available by appointment, provide information about the activities of the GFWC and several historic rooms, including the 1734 entryway, the Julia Ward Howe Drawing Room, the dining room, music room and the GFWC International President's office.  The headquarters also features changing exhibits of art, photographs and artifacts from its collections.

Description and building history
The GFWC headquarters is located southeast of Dupont Circle, on the south side of N Street between St. Matthew's Court and 17th Street.  It is a four-story masonry structure, built out of ashlar stone in a Renaissance Revival style.  The entrance is in a slightly raised basement level, sheltered by a splayed glass and iron marquee with supporting ironwork brackets.  The main floor windows are elongated, with paired casement windows topped by transoms, and keystoned lintels.  A polygonal bay projects from the first two floors on the left, and a shallower rectangular one projects to the right of the entrance; both are topped by lower balustrades.  The interior has been adapted for the GFWC's use, but retains some original finishes.

The house was built in 1875 by Rear Admiral William Radford, at a time when the Dupont Circle area was being developed as a fashionable residential neighborhood.  In 1895 he sold the house to the state of Massachusetts, which gave it to General Nelson A. Miles in recognition for his military service. It was next owned by John Jay White, a big-game hunter who traveled with Theodore Roosevelt, and who commissioned the murals by Albert Herter that adorn some of its walls.  In 1922 the house was purchased by the GFWC for use as its headquarters, a role it continues to play today.

The GFWC represents the culmination of smaller-scale women's organizations that sprang up in the 19th century, generally to improve the conditions for working and single women.  It was the first nationwide organization of this type, enabling a broader scope of influence by these local and regional organizations.

See also
List of National Historic Landmarks in Washington, D.C.
National Register of Historic Places listings in the upper NW Quadrant of Washington, D.C.

References

External links
General Federation of Women's Clubs web site

National Historic Landmarks in Washington, D.C.
Houses on the National Register of Historic Places in Washington, D.C.
Clubhouses on the National Register of Historic Places in Washington, D.C.
Dupont Circle
Renaissance Revival architecture in Washington, D.C.
Historic house museums in Washington, D.C.
Women's museums in the United States
Women's club buildings
Women in Washington, D.C.